The 1985 World Rally Championship was the 13th season of the Fédération Internationale de l'Automobile (FIA) World Rally Championship (WRC). The season consisted of 12 rallies following the same schedule as the previous season. Peugeot Sport's Timo Salonen beat Audi Sport's Stig Blomqvist and Walter Röhrl to the drivers' title. Peugeot won their first manufacturers' title, ahead of Audi and Lancia.

Summary

Peugeot Talbot Sport, having made a successful late-season entry to the Group B with their new Peugeot 205 Turbo 16 car, returned in 1985 for a full season with the car. Ari Vatanen, who had won three of the last four rallies of 1984 in the car, also returned with the team and in the first rally of the season, passed Walter Röhrl's Quattro in the snowy and icy terrain after incurring an eight-minute penalty caused by co-driver Terry Harryman's error. At the Swedish Rally, Vatanen won again, establishing himself as the early favorite for a driver's title, as well as putting Peugeot ahead of Audi.

A disaster struck in May at the Tour de Corse. On the 4th stage of the rally, Italian driver Attilio Bettega crashed his Lancia 037 into a tree and was killed instantly. His co-driver Maurizio Perissinot survived the crash uninjured. The crash raised questions about the safety aspects of Group B cars. Exactly one year later at the same event Henri Toivonen suffered a similar fatal accident forcing FIA to ban Group B.

Unfortunately, Vatanen had a major accident in Argentina while speeding down a long, straight road in top gear when his car crashed and rolled end-over-front. The flimsy exterior of the car shattered, but the strong rollcage absorbed most of the impact. The drivers were airlifted to hospital by Peugeot's helicopter, and Vatanen's injuries were severe and seemed life-threatening. Although he would recover and return to the sport, the Peugeot team was forced to turn to its other driver, Timo Salonen. Salonen had already taken the points lead and finished with the driver's championship on the strength of five rally wins.

Audi Sport faced the dual pressure of Peugeot's strong 205 car in competition, and waning company commitment to the Quattro rally program. With the danger of Group B rally becoming a more publicized issue, the company was questioning its involvement in the sport unless major changes were made to improve safety. While both Stig Blomqvist and Walter Röhrl were retained as drivers, they suffered generally at the hands of the Peugeot team although they would ultimately place second and third respectively. Their season however only included a single rally win between them, with Röhrl's triumph at Sanremo proving to be Audi's last Group B victory in the World Rally Championship.

The Lancia Martini team's season was an even greater disappointment than Audi's. The rear-wheel drive Lancia Sport 037 met with little success, even in the hands of such drivers as Markku Alén, Massimo Biasion, and Henri Toivonen. Toivonen would suffer an accident, breaking three vertebrae in his neck early on and missing most of the season. The team awaited the arrival of the Delta S4, a four-wheel-drive car, hoping it would give them a competitive advantage. Arriving for the final rally of the season, the RAC Rally, it succeeded in collecting the victory and giving the team hope for competing in the following season.

Austin Rallying made its entrance to the rally scene with the new MG Metro 6R4 and its 3.0L V6 engine, taking a podium position at the RAC. Austin's success would be brief however, as the Metro would struggle in the final season of Group B competition in 1986. As with previous seasons, while all 12 events were calculated for tallying the drivers' scores, only 11 of the events applied to the championship for manufacturers. The event in 1985 which applied only to driver standings was Rallye Côte d'Ivoire.

Teams and drivers

Events

Map

Schedule and results

Standings

Drivers

References

External links 

 FIA World Rally Championship 1985 at ewrc-results.com

World Rally Championship
World Rally Championship seasons